John Manning LoVetere  (May 31, 1936 – October 27, 2012) was an American football defensive tackle who played seven seasons in the National Football League for the Los Angeles Rams and New York Giants.  He played college football at Compton Junior College.

LoVetere lived in Watertown, Tennessee until his death.

References

External links
 

1936 births
2012 deaths
American football defensive linemen
Los Angeles Rams players
New York Giants players
Eastern Conference Pro Bowl players
People from Watertown, Tennessee